Walter Pektor was an Austrian Olympic javelin thrower. He represented his country in the men's javelin throw at the 1968 Summer Olympics. His distance was an 82.16 in the qualifiers and a 77.40 in the finals. He was the former Austrian record holder and nine-time Austrian champion.

References

1945 births
1994 deaths
Austrian male javelin throwers
Olympic athletes of Austria
Athletes (track and field) at the 1968 Summer Olympics